Esenlik  is a village in Çaycuma District, Zonguldak Province, Turkey.

References

Villages in Çaycuma District